Apache Parquet is a free and open-source column-oriented data storage format in the Apache Hadoop ecosystem. It is similar to RCFile and ORC, the other columnar-storage file formats in Hadoop, and is compatible with most of the data processing frameworks around Hadoop. It provides efficient data compression and encoding schemes with enhanced performance to handle complex data in bulk.

History
The open-source project to build Apache Parquet began as a joint effort between Twitter and Cloudera. Parquet was designed as an improvement on the Trevni columnar storage format created by Doug Cutting, the creator of Hadoop. The first version, Apache Parquet1.0, was released in July 2013. Since April 27, 2015, Apache Parquet has been a top-level Apache Software Foundation (ASF)-sponsored project.

Features
Apache Parquet is implemented using the record-shredding and assembly algorithm, which accommodates the complex data structures that can be used to store data. The values in each column are stored in contiguous memory locations, providing the following benefits:

 Column-wise compression is efficient in storage space
 Encoding and compression techniques specific to the type of data in each column can be used
 Queries that fetch specific column values need not read the entire row, thus improving performance

Apache Parquet is implemented using the Apache Thrift framework, which increases its flexibility; it can work with a number of programming languages like C++, Java, Python, PHP, etc.

As of August 2015, Parquet supports the big-data-processing frameworks including Apache Hive, Apache Drill, Apache Impala, Apache Crunch, Apache Pig, Cascading, Presto and Apache Spark. It is one of external data formats used by pandas Python data manipulation and analysis library.

Compression and encoding 
In Parquet, compression is performed column by column, which enables different encoding schemes to be used for text and integer data. This strategy also keeps the door open for newer and better encoding schemes to be implemented as they are invented.

Dictionary encoding 
Parquet has an automatic dictionary encoding enabled dynamically for data with a small number of unique values (i.e. below 105) that enables significant compression and boosts processing speed.

Bit packing 
Storage of integers is usually done with dedicated 32 or 64 bits per integer. For small integers, packing multiple integers into the same space makes storage more efficient.

Run-length encoding (RLE) 
To optimize storage of multiple occurrences of the same value, a single value is stored once along with the number of occurrences.

Parquet implements a hybrid of bit packing and RLE, in which the encoding switches based on which produces the best compression results. This strategy works well for certain types of integer data and combines well with dictionary encoding.

Comparison

Apache Parquet is comparable to RCFile and Optimized Row Columnar (ORC) file formats  all three fall under the category of columnar data storage within the Hadoop ecosystem. They all have better compression and encoding with improved read performance at the cost of slower writes. In addition to these features, Apache Parquet supports limited schema evolution, i.e., the schema can be modified according to the changes in the data. It also provides the ability to add new columns and merge schemas that do not conflict.

Apache Arrow is designed as an in-memory complement to on-disk columnar formats like Parquet and ORC. The Arrow and Parquet projects include libraries that allow for reading and writing between the two formats.

See also

 Apache Arrow
 Apache Pig
 Apache Hive
 Apache Impala
 Apache Drill
 Apache Kudu
 Apache Spark
 Apache Thrift
 Trino (SQL query engine)
 Presto (SQL query engine)
 SQLite embedded database system

References

External links
 
 
 Dremel paper

2015 software
Parquet
Cloud computing
Free system software
Hadoop
Software using the Apache license